Greatest Stories Live is a 1976 greatest hits live album by the American singer-songwriter Harry Chapin. It was recorded over three nights at three California venues in November 1975. Certain elements had to be re-recorded in the studio due to technical problems with the live recordings. The original LP release featured three new studio tracks, two of which ("She Is Always Seventeen" and "Love Is Just Another Word") were excluded from the CD release. "A Better Place to Be" was released as a single, and did manage to crack the Billboard Hot 100 chart.

The album is notable for its extended version of "30,000 Pounds of Bananas", infamous for Chapin's recounting of his brothers' remarks after hearing the original ending: "Harry...it sucks." The quote became so popular with Harry Chapin fans that concert shirts were sold with the quotation on it.

Track listing (CD release) 

"She Is Always Seventeen" and "Love Is Just Another Word" appear between "30,000 Pounds of Bananas" and "The Shortest Story" on side 4 of the original 1976 vinyl release.

Personnel
Harry Chapin - guitar, vocals
Ron Bacchiocchi - synthesizer, percussion, clavinet
Ed Bednarski - clarinet
Stephen Chapin - synthesizer, piano, vocals
Tom Chapin - guitar, banjo, vocals
Christine Faith - vocals
Cheryl Ferrio - vocals
Howie Fields - drums
David Kondziela - vocals
Paul Leka - piano, clavinet
Michael Masters - cello
Tim Moore - piano
Mark Mundy - vocals
Ronald Palmer - guitar, vocals
Don Payne - bass
Kathy Ramos - vocals
Tim Scott - cello
Allan Schwartzberg - drums
Frank Simms - vocals
George Simms - vocals
Ken Smith - percussion
Bob Springer - percussion
John Tropea - guitar
Betsy Wager - vocals
Doug Walker - bass, guitar, vocals
John Wallace - bass, vocals
Sue White - vocals
 Christopher von Koschembahr - vocals

Charts and certifications

Charts

Certifications

References

Harry Chapin albums
Albums produced by Paul Leka
1976 live albums
Elektra Records live albums